Astycus is a genus of beetles belonging to the family Curculionidae. Species are distributed throughout India, Sri Lanka, Myanmar, China, Thailand and Sumatra.

Description
Head consists with lateral eyes which are moderate and prominent. Rostrum deflected and longer than the head. Mentum trapeziform, whereas the emargination of the submentum truncate and without a peduncle. Antennce inserted before the middle of the rostrum with cylindrical scape. Prothorax with truncate apex, truncate or bisinuate base and the rounded sides. Scutellum present, with variable shapes. Elytra with elevated and sinuate basal margin. There is a distinct humeral callus constituting a true shoulder. Sternum with sometimes separated front coxa. Venter with rounded intercoxal process. Legs with rather longer front pair which is distinctly stouter than the others.

Species
 Astycus acutipennis Guérin-Méneville
 Astycus adamsoni Marshall, 1916
 Astycus adultus Schoenherr, 1823
 Astycus aequalis G.A.K.Marshall, 1916
 Astycus apicatus Marshall, 1916
 Astycus armatipes Marshall, 1916
 Astycus aureolus A.Hustache, 1937
 Astycus aurovittatus G.A.K.Marshall, 1916
 Astycus bilineatus Marshall, 1916
 Astycus canus Marshall, 1916
 Astycus chinensis Fairmaire, 1889
 Astycus chrysochlorus Dejean, 1835
 Astycus cinereus Marshall, 1916
 Astycus cinnamomeus Marshall, 1916
 Astycus cuprescens J.Faust, 1895
 Astycus destructor G.A.K.Marshall, 1916
 Astycus distigma A.Hustache, 1937
 Astycus doriae G.A.K.Marshall, 1916
 Astycus ebeninus G.A.K.Marshall, 1916
 Astycus femoralis G.A.K.Marshall, 1916
 Astycus flavovittatus Pascoe, 1881
 Astycus gestroi Marshall, 1916
 Astycus glabrifrons Marshall, 1916
 Astycus griseus Desbrochers, 1891
 Astycus hampsoni Marshall, 1916
 Astycus horni Marshall, 1916
 Astycus immunis G.A.K.Marshall, 1916
 Astycus ischnomioides A.Hustache, 1937
 Astycus lateralis Schoenherr, 1834
 Astycus levicollis Marshall, 1916
 Astycus lewisi Marshall, 1916
 Astycus limbatus Marshall, 1916
 Astycus mysticus Emden & F.van, 1936
 Astycus neglectus Marshall, 1916
 Astycus obtusus J.Sturm, 1826
 Astycus oculatus G.A.K.Marshall, 1916
 Astycus quadrivirgatus Desbrochers, 1891
 Astycus rutilans K.M.Heller, 1922
 Astycus scintillans Pascoe, 1887
 Astycus subacuminatus Faust, 1892
 Astycus subacuminntus J.Faust, 1892
 Astycus submarginalis G.A.K.Marshall, 1916
 Astycus sulphurifer E.Voss, 1933
 Astycus suturalis G.A.K.Marshall, 1916
 Astycus sylhetensis Marshall, 1916
 Astycus tessellatus A.Hustache, 1937
 Astycus tibialis Günther & Zumpt, 1933
 Astycus variabilis Gyllenhal, 1834
 Astycus viridianus Emden & F.van, 1936

References

Curculionidae
Curculionidae genera